Nawab Mohammad Mansoor Ali Khan Pataudi (also known as Mansur Ali Khan, or M. A. K. Pataudi; 5 January 1941 – 22 September 2011; nicknamed Tiger Pataudi) was an Indian cricketer and a former captain of the Indian cricket team.

Pataudi was appointed India's cricket captain at the age of 21, and described as "one of (its) greatest". Pataudi was also called the "best fielder in the world" of his time by commentator John Arlott and former England captain and contemporary, Ted Dexter.

Mansur Ali Khan was the son of Iftikhar Ali Khan Pataudi, the last ruler of the princely state of Pataudi during the British Raj.    After the death of his father in 1952, Pataudi succeeded him in receiving a privy purse, certain privileges, and the use of the title "Nawab of Pataudi" under terms accepted earlier when princely states were absorbed into independent India. However,  all were ended in 1971 by the 26th Amendment to the Constitution of India.

Early life
Born in Bhopal, Mansoor Ali Khan was the son of Iftikhar Ali Khan, himself a renowned cricketer, and the Nawab Begum of Bhopal, Sajida Sultan. His grandfather, Hamidullah Khan, was the last ruling Nawab of Bhopal, and his aunt, Abida Sultan, was the princess of Bhopal. Kaikhusrau Jahan, the Begum of Bhopal, was his great-grandmother, and Shahryar Khan, the chairman of Pakistan Cricket Board, was his first cousin. He was the former Nawab of Bhopal State and Pataudi State. The Pataudi family traces their origin to Faiz Talab Khan, an ethnic Pashtun from the Barech tribe of Kandahar, Afghanistan, who became the first Nawab of the Pataudi State in 1804.

He was educated at Minto Circle in Aligarh and Welham Boys' School in Dehradun (Uttarakhand), Lockers Park Prep School in Hertfordshire (where he was coached by Frank Woolley), and Winchester College. He read Arabic and French at Balliol College, Oxford.

His father died while playing polo in Delhi on Mansoor's eleventh birthday in 1952, whereupon Mansoor succeeded him as the ninth Nawab. Although the princely state of Pataudi had been merged with India after the end of the British Raj in 1947, he held the title until the entitlements were abolished by the Government of India through the 26th amendment to the constitution in 1971.

Cricketing career

Pataudi Jr., as Mansoor came to be known during his cricket career, was a right-handed batsman and a right-arm medium pace bowler. He was a schoolboy batting prodigy at Winchester, relying on his keen eyes to punish the bowling. He captained the school team in 1959, scoring 1,068 runs that season, beating the school record set in 1919 by Douglas Jardine. He also won the public schools rackets championship, with partner Christopher Snell.

He made his first-class debut for Sussex in August 1957, aged 16, and also played for Oxford while he was at university and was the first Indian captain there. On 1 July 1961, he was a passenger in a car which was involved in an accident in Hove.  A shard of glass from the broken windscreen penetrated and permanently damaged his right eye. A surgeon named Dr. David St Clair Roberts was called to operate on his eye, and was praised by Pataudi for saving one of his eyes. The damage caused Pataudi to see a doubled image, and it was feared this would end his cricketing career, but Pataudi was soon in the nets,  learning to play with one eye.

Despite his eye injury less than 6 months before, he made his Test debut playing against England in Delhi in December 1961. He found it easiest to play with his cap pulled down over his damaged right eye.  He scored 103 in the Third Test in Madras, helping India to its first series win against England. He was appointed vice-captain for the tour to the West Indies in 1962.  In March 1962, Mansoor became captain of the Indian cricket team after the sitting captain, Nari Contractor, was ruled out of the Fourth Test in Barbados due to an injury sustained by Contractor batting against Charlie Griffith in a tour match against Barbados. At 21 years and 77 days, he held the world record for the youngest Test captain until he was surpassed by Zimbabwe's Tatenda Taibu in May 2004 and later by Afghanistan's Rashid Khan in September 2019. As of November 2022, he remains the youngest Indian Test captain and third youngest International Test captain worldwide.

He played in 46 Test matches for India between 1961 and 1975, scoring 2,793 runs at a Test batting average of 34.91, including 6 Test centuries. Mansoor was captain of the Indian cricket team in 40 of his 46 matches, only 9 of which resulted in victory for his team, with 19 defeats and 19 draws. His victories included India's first ever Test match win overseas against New Zealand in 1968. India went on to win that series, making it India's first ever Test series win overseas. He lost the captaincy of the Indian cricket team for the tour to the West Indies in 1970–1, and did not play Tests from 1970 to 1972.  He returned to the India side captained by Ajit Wadekar in 1973, for the Third Test against England, and captained India against West Indies in 1974–5, but was finally dropped as a player in 1975.

Between 1957 and 1970 Mansoor, following his countrymen Ranjitsinhji and Duleepsinhji, played 137 first class matches for Sussex County Cricket Club scoring 3,054 runs at an average of 22.29. He captained Sussex in 1966.  In India, he played first-class cricket for Delhi in the North Zone until 1966, and then for Hyderabad in the South Zone.

He was an Indian Cricket Cricketer of the Year in 1962, and a Wisden Cricketer of the Year in 1968.  He published an autobiography, Tiger's Tale, in 1969.  He was the manager of the India team in 1974–5, and referee for two Ashes Tests in 1993. He was later a member of the council of the Indian Premier League.  In 2007, in commemoration of the 75th anniversary of India's Test debut, the Marylebone Cricket Club has commissioned a trophy for Test match series between India and England which was named the Pataudi Trophy in honour of his father, the 8th Nawab.

Pataudi holds the record for facing the most balls in a single test match when batting at number six position in Test history (554).

Personal life
Mansoor was in a steady relationship with Simi Garewal. Garewal admitted in an email interview that she was dating Pataudi and that he came to visit her on the sets of Teen Devian, in Avijit Ghosh's book, 40 Retakes: Bollywood Classics You May Have Missed. He broke up with her after he met Sharmila Tagore, whom he married on 27 December 1968. They had three children: Saif Ali Khan (b. 1970), a Bollywood actor, Saba Ali Khan (b. 1976), a jewellery designer, and Soha Ali Khan (b. 1978), a Bollywood actress and TV personality. The actress Kareena Kapoor Khan is his daughter-in-law, and the actress Sara Ali Khan is his granddaughter. Actor Kunal Khemu is his son-in-law.

Controversies 
Pataudi was arrested in October 2005 over the poaching of a blackbuck and two hares, but was released on bail. The case went on for nine years, and in January 2015, four years after his death, six people were convicted. This case is unrelated to the other blackbuck poaching case of Salman Khan that his son Saif Ali Khan Pataudi was involved in.

Death
Pataudi was admitted to Sir Ganga Ram Hospital in Rajendra Nagar, Central Delhi on 25 August 2011 with an acute lung infection caused by chronic interstitial lung disease which prevented his lungs from exchanging oxygen properly. He died in the hospital of respiratory failure on 22 September 2011. His body was buried at Pataudi, Gurgaon district, Haryana.

Awards and recognitions
 1964 Arjuna Award
 1967 Padma Shri

In honour of his outstanding contributions towards cricket, the Mansur Ali Khan Pataudi Memorial Lecture was instituted by the BCCI on 6 February 2013 with the inaugural lecture by Sunil Gavaskar on 20 February 2013. Sports complex building of Jamia Millia Islamia University was named after him in May 2016.

References

External links

 Obituary of The Nawab of Pataudi, The Daily Telegraph, 23 September 2011

1941 births
2011 deaths
Alumni of Balliol College, Oxford
Deaths from respiratory failure
Delhi cricketers
Indian cricketers
Indian Muslims
Indian Sunni Muslims
India Test cricket captains
India Test cricketers
International Cavaliers cricketers
Nawabs of India
North Zone cricketers
Oxford University cricketers
Cricketers from Bhopal
People educated at Lockers Park School
People educated at Winchester College
People from Gurgaon district
Sussex cricket captains
Sussex cricketers
South Zone cricketers
Recipients of the Arjuna Award
Recipients of the Padma Shri in sports
Vazir Sultan Tobacco cricketers
Wisden Cricketers of the Year
Indian people of Pashtun descent
Indian National Congress politicians from Madhya Pradesh
20th-century Indian politicians